The 2003 Colima earthquake occurred on 21 January with a moment magnitude of 7.6 and a maximum Mercalli intensity of VIII (Severe). The epicenter was located on the Pacific coast in the Mexican state of Colima. The earthquake was felt as far away as Mexico City and in southern parts of the United States.

Effects
The 2003 Colima earthquake resulted the 29 deaths and 300 injuries. Additionally, approximately 10,000 were left homeless as the earthquake destroyed 2,005 homes and seriously damaged 6,615. Most of the deaths and damage occurred in Villa de Álvarez, a city which borders the northern part of the city of Colima. Extensive damage (rating VIII) occurred in  the city of Colima and in Tecomán. Some deaths and damage occurred in the states of Jalisco and Michoacán and a few buildings were damaged as far away as Guanajuato and Morelos.  The quake was felt strongly (rating VI) in parts of Mexico City.  It was also felt in most of Mexico and in the United States in Corpus Christi, Texas, Dallas, Texas and El Paso, Texas.  Occupants of high-rise buildings in Houston, Texas also reported feeling its effects. Landslides closed a segment of the Colima-Guadalajara Highway and the port of Manzanillo. Power and telephone outages occurred in Mexico City. A local tsunami of about 1 m (peak-to-trough) was recorded at Manzanillo. A seiche was observed on Lake Pontchartrain in the US state of Louisiana, and sediment was stirred up in several Louisiana wells.

Tectonic summary
This shallow earthquake occurred in a seismically active zone near the coast of central Mexico. The earthquake occurred near the juncture of three tectonic plates: the North American Plate to the northeast, the Rivera Plate to the northwest, and the Cocos Plate to the south. Both the Rivera Plate and the Cocos Plate are being subsumed beneath the North American Plate. The slower subducting Rivera Plate is moving northwest at about 2 cm per year relative to the North American Plate and the faster Cocos plate is moving in a similar direction at a rate of about 4.5 cm per year.

Several significant earthquakes have occurred near the recent event. In 1932, a magnitude 8.4 thrust earthquake struck about 100 km to the north-northwest.  On 9 October 1995, a magnitude 7.6 earthquake struck about 50 km to the northwest killing at least 49 people and leaving 1,000 homeless. The most deadly earthquake in the region occurred about 170 km to the south-east on 19 September 1985. This magnitude 8.0 earthquake killed at least 9,500 people, injured about 30,000, and left 100,000 people homeless.

See also
List of earthquakes in 2003
List of earthquakes in Mexico

References

Sources

Further reading

External links

2003 disasters in Mexico
Earthquakes in Mexico
2003 earthquakes
2003 tsunamis
Colima
History of Colima
2003 in Mexico
Tsunamis in Mexico